Kirazuri  is a method used in Japanese woodblock printmaking using mica powder, or  to add sparkle.

When used for the background in portraits, depending on the base color, it is called Shiro-kirazuri (white), Kuro-kirazuri (literally black, but dark gray practically), and Beni-kirazuri (red).

Types 
There are several different types of kirazuri:

Surikira  which is a printing method where mica is mixed into the printing ink. Mineral paints are diluted with water and gelatin as binding, and put on the printing woodblock for background coloring.
Makikira  where very fine mica peppers are applied on paper using a sprinkling tool. While adhesive brushed onto paper surface is still wet, mica is shaken over it and attaches to it. Unfixed mica is removed with brush strokes after the paper dries.
Okikira  the design is painted with a mixture of mica and glue on brush, and the glue functions as a thickening agent to give texture to brush strokes.

Gallery

Further reading

See also 
 Sharaku
 Utamaro

References 

Ukiyo-e techniques